Simmern is an Ortsgemeinde – a community belonging to a Verbandsgemeinde – in the Westerwaldkreis in Rhineland-Palatinate, Germany.

Geography

Location
The community lies in the Westerwald east of Koblenz on the edge of the Nassau Nature Park. The village is characterized by agriculture and commuters to the nearby greater centre of Koblenz. The community belongs to the Verbandsgemeinde of Montabaur, a kind of collective municipality. Its seat is in the like-named town.

Neighbouring communities
Simmern's neighbours are Neuhäusel, Koblenz, Montabaur, Eitelborn, Urbar, Vallendar and Kadenbach.

History
In 1198, Simmern had its first documentary mention as Sevenburnen.

Politics

Community council
The council is made up of 17 council members, including the extraofficial mayor (Bürgermeister), who were elected in a municipal election on 13 June 2004.

Coat of arms
The wavy embattled (in the heraldic sense) pale with seven battlements in the community's arms refers to the placename Simmern, whose original name of Sevenburnen can be taken to mean “seven springs, wells, cisterns”. The red cross refers to Simmern's allegiance to the Electorate of Trier until 1803 and the golden lion to its allegiance to the Duchy of Nassau from 1815 to 1866.

Culture and sightseeing

Music
Currently there are three musical clubs in the community. These are the Apollonia Men's Singing Club founded in 1962, the St. Rochus church choir and the music club, which has been in existence since 1930.

Economy and infrastructure

The nearest Autobahn interchange is Höhr-Grenzhausen on the A 48, some 9 km away. The nearest railway station is in Koblenz on the Rechte Rheinstrecke.

References

External links
 Simmern 
 Private pages about the community 

Municipalities in Rhineland-Palatinate
Westerwaldkreis